The Guinness World Record (GWR) for fastest circumnavigation of the globe by bicycle is awarded for completing a continuous journey around the globe by bicycle and other means, consisting of a minimum 29,000 km (18,000 miles) in total distance cycled.

 The supported record is held by Mark Beaumont of Scotland, who completed the route accompanied by a motorized support vehicle in 78 days 14 hours, and 40 minutes.
 The unsupported female record is held by Jenny Graham of Scotland (a member of the Adventure Syndicate).  Graham completed her attempt in October 2018 in a total of 124 days. She cycled the route solo and totally unsupported, often sleeping rough in drainage ditches or behind bushes.

Guinness does not distinguish between supported and unsupported attempts. Most cyclists choose to do the challenge supported, especially through the Australian outback. GWR rules state that the journey should be continuous and in one direction (East to West or West to East), that the minimum distance ridden should be 18,000 miles (29,000 km), and that the total distance travelled by the bicycle and rider should exceed an Equator's length. The clock does not stop for any waiting time for transit flights or ferries or for the duration of the transit (see full rules below).

The principles for unsupported rides are:
 do it all yourself, under your own power;
 carry all your own gear (i.e. no domestiques); and
 no outside support (deliveries only to public addresses or 'open' homes, no support vehicles of any kind meeting the rider along the way to provide supplies). 'Pure' unsupported rides also preclude any visits from friends or others along the way. These rules require riders to be alone for the entire ride, with a minimum 5-bicycle-length distance from any other riders or support vehicles.

Guinness rules
The rules state "the journey should be continuous and in one direction (East to West or West to East), that the minimum distance ridden should be , and that the total distance travelled by the bicycle and rider should exceed an Equator's length, i.e. ." They also state that: "Any considerable distance travelled opposite to the direction of the attempt must be discounted from any calculations of the overall distance travelled," and that the route "must be ridden through two approximate antipodal points."

Alan Bate writes:

The record criteria requires the rider to cover 28,970 kilometers by bike, in an East to West or West to East direction, wavering no more than 5 degrees off course. The total journey distance must be a minimum of 40,075 kilometers, to include all transit by flight or sea. The ride must start and finish in the same place and must pass at least two antipodal points (these are two points that line up through the earth's centre). When the rider reaches a transit point to connect with a flight or boat to the next continent or country start point, the clock stops with regard to the actual riding time *(no longer the case any more since the rules have changed in relation to transit time, which is NOW included in the total time). As most of the earth's surface is water, this is unavoidable and fair as it applies to all athletes attempting the record. Once customs is cleared at the next destination, the clock immediately starts again. The same bicycle must be used throughout the attempt, although repairs and replacement parts and bikes are allowed for mechanical failure. Satellite tracking is highly recommended by Guinness World Records and a daily log, signatures of dignitaries and photographs at strategic points must be collated as evidence.

The requirement to pass at least two antipodal points causes some problems in route planning. For example, among popular countries for around-the-world cyclists, the antipodes of Australia is spread out over the Atlantic Ocean, that of North America over the Indian Ocean, that of Africa over mid Pacific Ocean, and that of Europe and most of Asia over the South Pacific Ocean, without any land mass there. Those land areas would not give any opportunities for an antipodal pair while cycling. Some possible pairs are China/Argentina, Malaysia/Peru, and Spain/New Zealand (Madrid and Wellington fall within the ±5-degree difference permitted by Guinness).

The length requirement also requires consideration. To cycle Lisbon–Vladivostok (13900 km), Perth–Brisbane (4300 km) and Los Angeles–St. John's (7200 km) with air travel between legs gives 25,400 km. So some detours are needed (such as Invercargill–Auckland, New Zealand, 1800 km, for the sake of the antipodes requirement).

History

Nick Sanders

Nick Sanders set the original record in 1984, riding  around the Northern Hemisphere in 138 days.

Jay Aldous & Matt DeWaal

From 2 April to 16 July 1984 Jay Aldous and Matt DeWaal rode 22,997 km/14,290 miles in 106 days to break Nick Sanders record set in 1981. Aldous and DeWaal started and ended in Salt Lake City, US, and traveled in an easterly direction passing through 15 different countries.

Andrew Slodkowski

In December 1993, Andrew Slodkowski rode "Around the World in 80 days on a bicycle". He started and ended in London UK, and traveled in an easterly direction passing through 14 different countries.

Steve Strange

Steve Strange, an Englishman, achieved Guinness's "Fastest True Circumnavigation of the Globe by Bicycle": 276 days. On 13 February 2005, he completed the first record attempt under the new Guinness rules, achieving a world record of 276 days and 19 hours.

Phil White
In April 2005, Phil White completed a record attempt in an estimated 299 days. His time did not beat the one set two months earlier by Steve Strange.

Mark Beaumont (2008)

On 14 February 2008, Mark Beaumont completed a circumnavigation of the globe by bicycle in 194 days and 17 hours.

James Bowthorpe
In September 2009 James Bowthorpe completed an eastward circumnavigation, starting and ending in London, in 176 days. This was not ratified by Guinness World Records.

Julian Sayarer
In December 2009 Julian Sayarer, a London-based cycle courier, completed a circumnavigation, starting at Rouen and going through Europe, Russia, Kazakhstan and China as far as Shanghai; Bangkok to Singapore; the length of New Zealand; Vancouver to the east coast of the US; and finally from Lisbon back to Rouen. The time was first described as 165 days, and ratified by Guinness at 169 days. Sayarer's blog about the ride is at This Is Not for Charity.

Vin Cox
On 1 August 2010, Vin Cox completed an unsupported circumnavigation of the globe, which was certified by Guinness as the new world record with a time of 163 days, 6 hours, 58 minutes.

Alan Bate
On 4 August 2010, Alan Bate completed the circumnavigation in 106 days 10 hours and 33 minutes, which was ratified by Guinness World Records in January 2012.

Mike Hall
On 4 June 2012, Mike Hall completed his circumnavigation (from Greenwich, eastwards to Greenwich) in 91 days 18 hours. His ride was totally unsupported. After the ride, Guinness World Records changed the rules to include total travel time. Under the new rules Hall recorded a time of 107 days 2 hours 30 minutes, which was not ratified by Guinness World Records.

Juliana Buhring
On 21 December 2012, Juliana Buhring, of British–German nationality (though born in Greece), arrived back in Naples to complete a circumnavigation in 152 days including total travel time, becoming the first woman to attempt and to complete a circumnavigation of the world by bicycle using a route that complies with the requirements of Guinness World Records. This was an unsupported ride.

Thomas Großerichter
On 31 December 2012, Thomas Großerichter, from Germany, completed a supported circumnavigation in 105 days 1 hour and 44 minutes. This was not certified by Guinness World Records.

Lee Fancourt
On 13 June 2014, Lee Fancourt completed a circumnavigation in 103 days, 23 hours, 15 minutes. 
This was not ratified by Guinness World Records. Fancourt's record attempt was disqualified after failing to return to the point in India where he took a taxi in order to help out his support crew.

Paola Gianotti
Paola Gianotti started and finished at Ivrea, Turin, Italy, from 8 March to 30 November 2014: 144 days. This was a supported ride. During her voyage, on 16 May 2014, Gianotti was injured in a road accident which resulted in a fractured vertebra. Although the Guinness World Record rules state that the clock does not stop, Gianotti's time was frozen for four months till she recovered and resumed her attempt on 18 September 2014. This was ratified at the time by Guinness as being the world record, but much debated at the time.

Andrew Nicholson
Former speedskater Andrew Nicholson (New Zealand) completed an unsupported circumnavigation 29,179 km in 123 days, 1 hour and 6 minutes. The ride, which was unsupported, was recognized by Guinness. Nicholson started and ended his journey at Auckland International Airport, New Zealand, between 12 August and 13 December 2015.

Mark Beaumont (2017)
On 18 September 2017, Mark Beaumont arrived in Paris having completed a supported circumnavigation of the globe by bicycle in 78 days 14 hours, and 40 minutes. This beat his previous unsupported attempt by 115 days and beat the previous world record by 44 days and 10 hours and should be regarded as the record. This attempt was verified by Guinness World Records as he finished in Paris. The BBC reported, "During the trip, Mark was also awarded the Guinness World Records title for the most miles cycled in a month, from Paris to Perth, Australia, verified at 7,031 miles (11,315km)". Beaumont had significant support on his ride from a "base camp" team who stayed in Scotland, and "on the road" teams who followed in camper vans which provided him a comfortable place to rest when off the bike. The support team covered duties ranging from preparing his meals and ensuring optimum nutrition, optimising his route to avoid ratification pitfalls, providing massages to help alleviate the discomfort of spending long hours in the same position, and psychological support during low points.

Vedangi Kulkarni (2018) 
Between July and December 2018, Vedangi Kulkarni, a native of Pune studying at Bournemouth University, attempted to become the fastest woman to circumnavigate the world on bicycle. Although she did not succeed in this, she was the "fastest Asian" to do so. Her journey started at Perth, crossing to Brisbane, crossing New Zealand, from Vancouver to Halifax, across Iceland, from Portugal to Finland, across Russia, 4,000 km across India to Kolkata; and from there flying to Perth for a 15 km ride to the starting point. The ride took 159 days as far as Kolkata and its distance exceeded 29,000 km. Kulkarni was 19 when she started and 20 when she finished the ride. She became "the fourth fastest woman to cycle round the world, as well as the youngest".

Jenny Graham (2018)
On 18 October 2018 Jenny Graham arrived in Berlin having completed an unsupported circumnavigation of the globe by bicycle in 124 Days, 10 hours and 50 minutes. This has now been verified by Guinness World Records and as such is the new woman's record.

Caroline Soubayroux & David Ferguson (2021-2022)
In September 2021, Caroline Soubayroux and David Ferguson, a married couple based in London, left from The Royal London Hospital in Whitechapel to try and set a new Guinness world record circumnavigation for a married couple on two bikes. Both of them took a six-month sabbatical leave from their full-time career in Investment Banking and Orthopaedics Surgery to allow for the trip. The impact of the COVID-19 pandemic meant they suffered delays and rode a majority of their circumnavigation in the Southern Hemisphere, crossing South America and Africa. Their attempt was fully unsupported with the exception of the Australian leg where a camping van driven by Ferguson's father provided camp for the night. New Zealand being closed at the time of their travel, their antipodal point was Honolulu in Hawaii, the archipelago being the approximate antipode of Botswana. Soubayroux and Ferguson successfully completed their circumnavigation on 16 April 2022. The record is being verified by Guinness World Records.

Tandem record

John Whybrow and George Agate 
On 25 March 2017, John Whybrow and George Agate (known as 'The Tandem Men'), set the first tandem bicycle circumnavigation record. Starting and finishing in Canterbury, UK, the pair completed their attempt in 290 days, 7 hours and 36 minutes aboard an Orbit Tandem. This was an unsupported ride.

Lloyd Collier and Louis Snellgrove 
On 16 May 2019, Lloyd Collier and Louis Snellgrove cycled 29,140 km and crossed the finishing line at the Adelaide Oval, Australia in 281 days to achieve the Guinness World Record. They rode through 24 countries and 5 continents. Both emergency doctors, they raised money for Spinal Research and The Brain foundation. Their ride was westwards and unsupported.

Cat Dixon and Raz Marsden 
On the 29th June 2019, Cat Dixon and Raz Marsden (both UK) set out on their tandem bike to embark on what would become a record-breaking adventure around the world; completing their journey in 263 days, 8 hours and 7 minutes. 
Cat, 54, and Raz, 55, set out from Oxford last year, covering 18,263 miles on a route that took them through 25 different countries and five continents. The record-breaking route: Starting in Oxford, UK, then onto France, Monaco, Italy, Slovenia, Croatia, Bosnia and Herzegovina, Montenegro, Albania, Macedonia, Greece, Turkey, Georgia, India, Myanmar, Thailand, Malaysia, Singapore, Australia, New Zealand, United States, Mexico, Morocco, Spain, Gibraltar and then finally back through France to the UK, where they completed their journey. "We have highlights from every country that we visited and would definitely return to see many- although maybe at a slower pace," the pair said.

Unicycling

Wally Watts 
Between 1976 and 1978, Walter J. Watts, known as "Wobbling" Wally Watts unicycled 12,000 miles around the world. Travelling eastward, he started and ended in New York. Some countries he unicycled in: UK, France, Italy, Greece, Turkey, India, Australia, New Zealand, United States.

Ed Pratt 
From March 2015 to July 27, 2018, Ed Pratt unicycled 21,000 miles (33,000 km) for 3 years, 135 days, starting and ending in Somerset, England. He had a specially made pannier that helped him to complete the trip unsupported. The trip was discontinuous in time: he suspended his trip during the winter time due to icy, slippery conditions. This discontinuity lasted longer than 14 days, and was one of the reasons Pratt did not receive the Guinness World Record for Unicycling around the world. When he was no longer able satisfy the conditions for the Guinness record, he made his own rule that on land he would ride his unicycle, or walk, and push it, so that "apart from the watery bits [he would make] an unbroken unicycle tire track around the entire planet". He was awarded the  award for using the trip to fundraise for the charity School in a Bag, which delivers school equipment to children in need around the world.

See also
 Record for distance in a calendar year

Notes

References

Cycling records and statistics
Sports world records
Ultra-distance cycling